Deadly Soma is a 2005 Kannada biographical crime film written and directed by Ravi Srivatsa. The film is based on the real life incidents of an infamous underworld don, Deadly Soma. The film stars Aditya as the protagonist and Rakshita as his lady love. Tara, Devaraj and Avinash play other pivotal roles.

The film featured an original score and soundtrack composed by Sadhu Kokila. The film, upon release, received a positive response from both critics and audience and was subsequently remade in Telugu as Nandeeswarudu (2012). It was also released in Hindi as Ek Aur Aathank.

A sequel film Deadly-2 was made by the director and lead actor and released in 2010 which could not match the success level to this film.

Cast 

 Aditya as Somashekara
 Rakshita as Jyothi
 Devaraj
 Tara 
 Kishore
 Avinash
 Vijay
 Shobhraj as Babaraj
 Kote Prabhakar
 Bullet Prakash
 Girija Lokesh

Plot
This film is based on the real-life story of a young man from a well-civilized family who takes the criminal route due to unavoidable circumstances.

Soundtrack 
The music was composed by Sadhu Kokila.

Sequel
The film has a sequel Deadly-2 (2010).

References 

2005 films
2000s Kannada-language films
2000s crime action films
Indian crime action films
Indian biographical films
Indian films based on actual events
Kannada films remade in other languages
Biographical action films
Indian gangster films
2000s biographical films